Karl Friedrich Vieweg (also Carl;)  was a German entomologist who specialised in Lepidoptera

In 1790 Vieweg, a Prussian, published Tabellarisches Verzeichniss der in der Churmark Brandenburg einheimischen Schmetterlinge. Zweytes Heft. Mit drey illuminirten Kupfertafeln. 1–98, 3 plates  (Vieweg, Berlin). Vieweg is an author of names published under the International Code of Zoological Nomenclature.

External links
Brandenburg einheimischen Schmetterlinge

Year of birth missing
Year of death missing
18th-century German scientists
German lepidopterists